Oncidium croesus is a species of orchid endemic to Brazil (Pernambuco to Rio de Janeiro).

References

External links 

croesus
Endemic orchids of Brazil
Orchids of Pernambuco
Orchids of Rio de Janeiro (state)